The United Nations Convention on the Law of the Sea (UNCLOS), also called the Law of the Sea Convention or the Law of the Sea Treaty, is an international agreement that establishes a legal framework for all marine and maritime activities. , 167 countries and the European Union are parties. 

The convention resulted from the third United Nations Conference on the Law of the Sea (UNCLOS III), which took place between 1973 and 1982. UNCLOS replaced the four treaties of the 1958 Convention on the High Seas. UNCLOS came into force in 1994, a year after Guyana became the 60th nation to ratify the treaty.  In 2023, agreement was reached on a High Seas Treaty to be added as an instrument of the convention, to protect ocean life in international waters.  This would provide measures including Marine Protected Areas and environmental impact assessments.

While the secretary-general of the United Nations receives instruments of ratification and accession and the UN provides support for meetings of states party to the convention, the United Nations Secretariat has no direct operational role in the implementation of the convention. A UN specialized agency, the International Maritime Organization, does play a role, however, as well as other bodies such as the International Whaling Commission and the International Seabed Authority (ISA), which was established by the convention itself.

Background
UNCLOS replaces the older 'freedom of the seas' concept, dating from the 17th century. According to this concept, national rights were limited to a specified belt of water extending from a nation's coastlines, usually  (three-mile limit), according to the 'cannon shot' rule developed by the Dutch jurist Cornelius van Bynkershoek. All waters beyond national boundaries were considered international waters: free to all nations, but belonging to none of them (the mare liberum principle propounded by Hugo Grotius).

In the early 20th century, some nations expressed their desire to extend national claims: to include mineral resources, to protect fish stocks, and to provide the means to enforce pollution controls. (The League of Nations called a 1930 conference at The Hague, but no agreements resulted.) Using the customary international law principle of a nation's right to protect its natural resources, President Harry S. Truman in 1945 extended United States control to all the natural resources of its continental shelf. Other nations were quick to follow suit.

By 1967, only 25 nations still used the old three nautical mile limit, while 66 nations had set a  territorial limit  and eight had set a  limit. , only Jordan still uses the  limit. That limit is also used in certain Australian islands, an area of Belize, some Japanese straits, certain areas of Papua New Guinea, and a few British Overseas Territories, such as Gibraltar.

UNCLOS does not deal with matters of territorial disputes or to resolve issues of sovereignty, as that field is governed by rules of customary international law on the acquisition and loss of territory.

The United Nations Sustainable Development Goal 14 has a target regarding conservative and sustainable use of oceans and their resources in line with UNCLOS legal framework.

UNCLOS I 

In 1956, the United Nations held its first Conference on the Law of the Sea (UNCLOS I) at Geneva, Switzerland. UNCLOS I resulted in four treaties concluded in 1958:

 Convention on the Territorial Sea and Contiguous Zone, entry into force: 10 September 1964
 Convention on the Continental Shelf, entry into force: 10 June 1964
 Convention on the High Seas, entry into force: 30 September 1962
 Convention on Fishing and Conservation of Living Resources of the High Seas, entry into force: 20 March 1966

Although UNCLOS I was considered a success, it left open the important issue of breadth of territorial waters.

UNCLOS II 

In 1960, the United Nations held the second Conference on the Law of the Sea ("UNCLOS II"); however, the six-week Geneva conference did not result in any new agreements. Generally speaking, developing nations and third world countries participated only as clients, allies, or dependents of the United States or the Soviet Union, with no significant voice of their own.

UNCLOS III 

The issue of varying claims of territorial waters was raised in the UN in 1967 by Arvid Pardo of Malta, and in 1973 the Third United Nations Conference on the Law of the Sea convened in New York. In an attempt to reduce the possibility of groups of nation-states dominating the negotiations, the conference used a consensus process rather than majority vote. With more than 160 nations participating, the conference lasted until 1982. The resulting convention came into force on 16 November 1994, one year after the 60th state, Guyana, ratified the treaty.

The convention introduced a number of provisions. The most significant issues covered were setting limits, navigation, archipelagic status and transit regimes, exclusive economic zones (EEZs), continental shelf jurisdiction, deep seabed mining, the exploitation regime, protection of the marine environment, scientific research, and settlement of disputes.

The convention set the limit of various areas, measured from a carefully defined baseline. (Normally, a sea baseline follows the low-water line, but when the coastline is deeply indented, has fringing islands or is highly unstable, straight baselines may be used.) The areas are as follows:

 Internal watersCovers all water and waterways on the landward side of the baseline. The coastal state is free to set laws, regulate use, and use any resource. Foreign vessels have no right of passage within internal waters. A vessel in the high seas assumes jurisdiction under the internal laws of its flag state.
Vessels were given the right of innocent passage through any territorial waters, with strategic straits allowing the passage of military craft as transit passage, in that naval vessels are allowed to maintain postures that would be illegal in territorial waters. "Innocent passage" is defined by the convention as passing through waters in an expeditious and continuous manner, which is not "prejudicial to the peace, good order or the security" of the coastal state. Fishing, polluting, weapons practice, and spying are not "innocent", and submarines and other underwater vehicles are required to navigate on the surface and to show their flag. Nations can also temporarily suspend innocent passage in specific areas of their territorial seas, if doing so is essential for the protection of their security.
 Archipelagic waters The convention set the definition of "Archipelagic States" in Part IV, which also defines how the state can draw its territorial borders. A baseline is drawn between the outermost points of the outermost islands, subject to these points being sufficiently close to one another. All waters inside this baseline are designated "Archipelagic Waters". The state has sovereignty over these waters mostly to the extent it has over internal waters, but subject to existing rights including traditional fishing rights of immediately adjacent states. Foreign vessels have right of innocent passage through archipelagic waters, but archipelagic states may limit innocent passage to designated sea lanes.
 Contiguous zoneBeyond the  limit, there is a further  from the territorial sea baseline limit, the contiguous zone. Here a state can continue to enforce laws in four specific areas (customs, taxation, immigration, and pollution) if the infringement started or is about to occur within the state's territory or territorial waters. This makes the contiguous zone a hot pursuit area.
 Exclusive economic zones (EEZs) These extend  from the baseline. Within this area, the coastal nation has sole exploitation rights over all natural resources. In casual use, the term may include the territorial sea and even the continental shelf. The EEZs were introduced to halt the increasingly heated clashes over fishing rights, although oil was also becoming important. Foreign nations have the freedom of navigation and overflight, subject to the regulation of the coastal states. Foreign states may also lay submarine pipes and cables.
A state's continental shelf may exceed  until the natural prolongation ends. However, it may never exceed  from the baseline; nor may it exceed  beyond the  isobath (the line connecting the depth of 2 500 m). Coastal states have the right to harvest mineral and non-living material in the subsoil of its continental shelf, to the exclusion of others. Coastal states also have exclusive control over living resources "attached" to the continental shelf, but not to creatures living in the water column beyond the exclusive economic zone.

The area outside these areas is referred to as the "high seas" or simply "the Area".

Aside from its provisions defining ocean boundaries, the convention establishes general obligations for safeguarding the marine environment and protecting freedom of scientific research on the high seas, and also creates an innovative legal regime for controlling mineral resource exploitation in deep seabed areas beyond national jurisdiction, through an International Seabed Authority and the common heritage of mankind principle.

Landlocked states are given a right of access to and from the sea, without taxation of traffic through transit states.

Part XI and the 1994 Agreement 

Part XI of the convention provides for a regime relating to minerals on the seabed outside any state's territorial waters or exclusive economic zones (EEZ). It establishes an International Seabed Authority (ISA) to authorize seabed exploration and mining and collect and distribute the seabed mining royalty.

The United States objected to the provisions of Part XI of the convention on several grounds, arguing that the treaty was unfavorable to American economic and security interests. Due to Part XI, the United States refused to ratify the UNCLOS, although it expressed agreement with the remaining provisions of the convention.

From 1982 to 1990, the United States accepted all but Part XI as customary international law, while attempting to establish an alternative regime for exploitation of the minerals of the deep seabed. An agreement was made with other seabed mining nations and licenses were granted to four international consortia. Concurrently, the Preparatory Commission was established to prepare for the eventual coming into force of the convention-recognized claims by applicants, sponsored by signatories of the convention. Overlaps between the two groups were resolved, but a decline in the demand for minerals from the seabed made the seabed regime significantly less relevant. In addition, the decline of communism in the late 1980s removed much of the support for some of the more contentious Part XI provisions.

In 1990, consultations began between signatories and non-signatories (including the United States) over the possibility of modifying the convention to allow the industrialized countries to join the convention. The resulting 1994 Agreement on Implementation was adopted as a binding international convention. It mandated that key articles, including those on limitation of seabed production and mandatory technology transfer, would not be applied, that the United States, if it became a member, would be guaranteed a seat on the Council of the International Seabed Authority, and finally, that voting would be done in groups, with each group able to block decisions on substantive matters. The 1994 Agreement also established a Finance Committee that would originate the financial decisions of the Authority, to which the largest donors would automatically be members and in which decisions would be made by consensus.

On 1 February 2011, the Seabed Disputes Chamber of the International Tribunal for the Law of the Sea (ITLOS) issued an advisory opinion concerning the legal responsibilities and obligations of states parties to the convention with respect to the sponsorship of activities in the area in accordance with Part XI of the convention and the 1994 agreement. The advisory opinion was issued in response to a formal request made by the International Seabed Authority following two prior applications the authority's Legal and Technical Commission had received from the Republic of Nauru and the Kingdom of Tonga regarding proposed activities (a plan of work to explore for polymetallic nodules) to be undertaken in the area by two state-sponsored contractors – Nauru Ocean Resources Inc. (sponsored by the Republic of Nauru) and Tonga Offshore Mining Ltd. (sponsored by the Kingdom of Tonga). The advisory opinion set forth the international legal responsibilities and obligations of sponsoring states and the authority to ensure that sponsored activities do not harm the marine environment, consistent with the applicable provisions of UNCLOS Part XI, Authority regulations, ITLOS case law, other international environmental treaties, and Principle 15 of the UN Rio Declaration.

Part XII – Protecting the marine environment 

Part XII of UNCLOS contains special provisions for the protection of the marine environment, obligating all states to collaborate in this matter, as well as placing special obligations on flag states to ensure that ships under their flags adhere to international environmental regulations, often adopted by the IMO. The MARPOL convention is an example of such regulation. Part XII also bestows coastal and port states with broadened jurisdictional rights for enforcing international environmental regulation within their territory and on the high seas.

Biodiversity beyond national jurisdiction 

In 2017, the United Nations General Assembly (UNGA) voted to convene an intergovernmental conference (IGC) to consider establishing an international legally binding instrument (ILBI) on the conservation and sustainable use of biodiversity beyond national jurisdiction (BBNJ). This is considered necessary because UNCLOS does not currently provide a framework for areas beyond national jurisdiction. There is a particular concern for marine biodiversity and the impact of overfishing on global fish stocks and ecosystem stability. The IGC convened a total of six sessions in 2018, 2019, 2022 and 2023 to negotiate the text for the BBNJ legal instrument. Progress was made in the four main elements: marine genetic resources (MGRs), benefit sharing using area-based management tools (ABMTs) including marine protected areas (MPAs), environmental impact assessments (EIAs) and capacity building and the transfer of marine technology (CB&TT). The fifth round of talks in August 2022 failed to produce an agreement, due in part to significant disagreements over how to share benefits derived from marine genetic resources and digital sequence information.  Agreement on a text was reached on 4 March 2023, after the sixth round of talks at the UN in New York.  The European Union pledged financial support for the process of ratification and implementation of the treaty.

Parties 

The convention was opened for signature on 10 December 1982 and entered into force on 16 November 1994 upon deposition of the 60th instrument of ratification. The convention has been ratified by 168 parties, which includes 164 UN member states, 1 UN Observer state (Palestine) and two associated countries (the Cook Islands and Niue) plus the European Union.

Role
The significance of UNCLOS stems from the fact that it systemizes and codifies the standards and principles of international maritime law, which are based on centuries of maritime experience and are expressed to a great extent in the United Nations Charter and current international maritime law norms, such as the Geneva Conventions of 1958. A large portion of these requirements were further strengthened and expanded.

See also 

 
 
 
 
 
 
 
 
 
 
 
 
 
 
 
 
 
 
 List of territories governed by the United Nations

Further reading 

 Enyew, Endalew Lijalem (2022). "Sailing with TWAIL: A Historical Inquiry into Third World Perspectives on the Law of the Sea". 21(3) Chinese Journal of International Law.
 Sara McLaughlin Mitchell and Andrew P. Owsiak (2021). "Judicialization of the Sea: Bargaining in the Shadow of UNCLOS." American Journal of International Law.

References

External links 

 Text of the treaty (pdf)
 List of countries that have ratified Law of the Sea Conventions
 International Tribunal for the Law of the Sea
 Permanent Court of Arbitration – Past and Pending Cases
 Decisions of the World Court Relevant to the UNCLOS (2010) and Contents & Indexes
 United Nations Division for Ocean Affairs and the Law of the Sea
 UN Commission on the Limits of the Continental Shelf
  
 UNEP Shelf Programme, UN organisation set up to assist States in delineating their continental shelf beyond 200 nautical miles (370 km)
 UNCLOS Italian Database
 EEZ/CS Boundaries Canadian Database
 Digital Map of the World's Exclusive Economic Zones
 SOPAC Maritime Boundaries Database
 Introductory note by Tullio Treves, procedural history note and audiovisual material on the 1958 Geneva Conventions on the Law of the Sea in the Historic Archives of the United Nations Audiovisual Library of International Law
 Introductory note by Tullio Treves, procedural history note and audiovisual material on the United Nations Convention on the Law of the Sea in the Historic Archives of the United Nations Audiovisual Library of International Law

1994 in the environment

Convention on the Law of the Sea
United Nations Convention on the Law of the Sea
United Nations Convention on the Law of the Sea
United Nations Convention on the Law of the Sea
United Nations Convention on the Law of the Sea
Treaties of Albania
Treaties of Algeria
Treaties of the People's Republic of Angola
Treaties of Antigua and Barbuda
Treaties of Argentina
Treaties of Armenia
Treaties of Australia
Treaties of Austria
Treaties of Azerbaijan
Treaties of the Bahamas
Treaties of Bahrain
Treaties of Bangladesh
Treaties of Barbados
Treaties of Belarus
Treaties of Belgium
Treaties of Belize
Treaties of Benin
Treaties of Bolivia
Treaties of Bosnia and Herzegovina
Treaties of Botswana
Treaties of Brazil
Treaties of Brunei
Treaties of Bulgaria
Treaties of Burkina Faso
Treaties of Cameroon
Treaties of Canada
Treaties of Cape Verde
Treaties of Chad
Treaties of Chile
Treaties of the People's Republic of China
Treaties of the Comoros
Treaties of the Republic of the Congo
Treaties of the Cook Islands
Treaties of Costa Rica
Treaties of Ivory Coast
Treaties of Croatia
Treaties of Cuba
Treaties of Cyprus
Treaties of the Czech Republic
Treaties of Zaire
Treaties of Denmark
Treaties of Djibouti
Treaties of Dominica
Treaties of the Dominican Republic
Treaties of Ecuador
Treaties of Egypt
Treaties of Equatorial Guinea
Treaties of Estonia
Treaties of Fiji
Treaties of Finland
Treaties of France
Treaties of Gabon
Treaties of the Gambia
Treaties of Germany
Treaties of East Germany
Treaties of Ghana
Treaties of Greece
Treaties of Grenada
Treaties of Guatemala
Treaties of Guinea
Treaties of Guinea-Bissau
Treaties of Guyana
Treaties of Haiti
Treaties of Honduras
Treaties of Hungary
Treaties of Iceland
Treaties of India
Treaties of Indonesia
Treaties of Ba'athist Iraq
Treaties of Ireland
Treaties of Italy
Treaties of Jamaica
Treaties of Japan
Treaties of Jordan
Treaties of Kenya
Treaties of Kiribati
Treaties of Kuwait
Treaties of Laos
Treaties of Latvia
Treaties of Lebanon
Treaties of Lesotho
Treaties of Liberia
Treaties of Lithuania
Treaties of Luxembourg
Treaties of Madagascar
Treaties of Malawi
Treaties of Malaysia
Treaties of the Maldives
Treaties of Mali
Treaties of Malta
Treaties of the Marshall Islands
Treaties of Mauritania
Treaties of Mauritius
Treaties of Mexico
Treaties of the Federated States of Micronesia
Treaties of Monaco
Treaties of Mongolia
Treaties of Montenegro
Treaties of Morocco
Treaties of Mozambique
Treaties of Myanmar
Treaties of Namibia
Treaties of Nauru
Treaties of Nepal
Treaties of the Netherlands
Treaties of New Zealand
Treaties of Nicaragua
Treaties of Niger
Treaties of Nigeria
Treaties of Norway
Treaties of Oman
Treaties of Pakistan
Treaties of Palau
Treaties of the State of Palestine
Treaties of Panama
Treaties of Papua New Guinea
Treaties of Paraguay
Treaties of the Philippines
Treaties of Poland
Treaties of Portugal
Treaties of Qatar
Treaties of South Korea
Treaties of Moldova
Treaties of Romania
Treaties of Russia
Treaties of Samoa
Treaties of São Tomé and Príncipe
Treaties of Saudi Arabia
Treaties of Senegal
Treaties of Serbia and Montenegro
Treaties of Seychelles
Treaties of Sierra Leone
Treaties of Singapore
Treaties of Slovakia
Treaties of Slovenia
Treaties of the Solomon Islands
Treaties of the Somali Democratic Republic
Treaties of South Africa
Treaties of Spain
Treaties of Sri Lanka
Treaties of Saint Kitts and Nevis
Treaties of Saint Lucia
Treaties of Saint Vincent and the Grenadines
Treaties of the Democratic Republic of the Sudan
Treaties of Suriname
Treaties of Eswatini
Treaties of Sweden
Treaties of Switzerland
Treaties of Thailand
Treaties of North Macedonia
Treaties of East Timor
Treaties of Togo
Treaties of Tonga
Treaties of Trinidad and Tobago
Treaties of Tunisia
Treaties of Tuvalu
Treaties of Uganda
Treaties of Ukraine
Treaties of the United Kingdom
Treaties of Tanzania
Treaties of Uruguay
Treaties of Vanuatu
Treaties of Vietnam
Treaties of the Yemen Arab Republic
Treaties of Yugoslavia
Treaties of Zambia
Treaties of Zimbabwe
Treaties entered into by the European Union
1982 in Jamaica
United Nations Convention on the Law of the Sea
Treaties establishing intergovernmental organizations
Treaties extended to Aruba
Treaties extended to the Netherlands Antilles
Treaties extended to Jersey
Treaties extended to Guernsey
Treaties extended to the Isle of Man
Treaties extended to Anguilla
Treaties extended to Bermuda
Treaties extended to the British Antarctic Territory
Treaties extended to the British Indian Ocean Territory
Treaties extended to the British Virgin Islands
Treaties extended to the Cayman Islands
Treaties extended to the Falkland Islands
Treaties extended to Gibraltar
Treaties extended to Montserrat
Treaties extended to the Pitcairn Islands
Treaties extended to Saint Helena, Ascension and Tristan da Cunha
Treaties extended to South Georgia and the South Sandwich Islands
Treaties extended to the Turks and Caicos Islands
Treaties extended to the Faroe Islands
Treaties extended to Greenland